Schedule H is a class of prescription drugs in India appearing as an appendix to the Drugs and Cosmetics Rules, 1945 introduced in 1945. These are drugs which cannot be purchased over the counter without the prescription of a qualified doctor. The manufacture and sales of all drugs are covered under the Drugs and Cosmetics Act and Rules. It is revised at times based on the advice of the Drugs Technical Advisory Board, part of the Central Drugs Standard Control Organization in the Ministry of Health and Family Welfare.  The most recent schedule H (2006) lists 536 drugs from abacavir to zuclopenthixol.

However, enforcement of Schedule H laws in India is lax, compared to the more restrictive Schedule X, for which a mandatory documentation trail must be maintained.

List
List of Schedule H drugs in India according to Drug and Cosmetics Act ( Amendment) Rules. Published on 2020.

References

Drug control law in India